The Very Best of Don McLean is the first greatest hits album by American singer and guitarist Don McLean. It features 15 of McLean's songs.

Track listing 
American Pie
Vincent
Castles in the Air
Dreidel
Winterwood
Everyday
Building My Body
And I Love You So
Mountains of Mourne
Fools Paradise
Wonderful Baby
La La Love You
Prime Time
Jump
Crying

Chart positions

Certifications

References

1980 greatest hits albums
Very Best, The